Joseph Patrick Haverty RHA (1794 – 27 July 1864) was an Irish painter.

Biography
A native of Galway City, Haverty was first recognized in 1814 after sending a painting to the Hibernian Society of Artists. His 1844 piece, The Limerick Piper, became one of the most famous 19th century lithographs. The work features Patrick O'Brien, a blind Gaelic piper from Labasheeda, popularised by Haverty's painting. He painted genre scenes, landscapes, and portraits, a fine example of the latter features Daniel O’Connell. Haverty died of edema on 27 July 1864 following a long illness, and was buried at Glasnevin Cemetery. In November 2003, one of Haverty's paintings sold for a record €227,000 at one of Christie's auctions of Irish art.

His step brother was the author, Martin Haverty.

References

External links
Haverty at Limerick School of Art
If Walls Could Talk (Limerick School of Art)

1794 births
1864 deaths
Burials at Glasnevin Cemetery
19th-century Irish painters
Irish male painters
People from County Galway
People from Galway (city)
Deaths from edema
19th-century Irish male artists